Vera Allinson (1899–1971) was a British screenwriter. She wrote the screenplay for several films made by the American director Bernard Vorhaus at Twickenham Studios, including Street Song.

Selected filmography
 Crime on the Hill (1933)
 Money for Speed (1933)
 Bella Donna (1934)
 Blind Justice (1934)
 The Broken Melody (1934)
 Street Song (1935)
 Ten Minute Alibi (1935)
 House Broken (1936)
 Ticket of Leave (1936)
 Danny Boy (1941)
 Sheepdog of the Hills (1941)
Bobs your uncle  1942

References

Bibliography
 Low, Rachael. Filmmaking in 1930s Britain. George Allen & Unwin, 1985.
 Richards, Jeffrey (ed.). The Unknown 1930s: An Alternative History of the British Cinema, 1929– 1939. I.B. Tauris & Co, 1998.

External links

1899 births
1971 deaths
Writers from London
British women screenwriters
People from Finchley
20th-century British screenwriters